The 2010 Regional League Division 2  (also known as the AIS Regional League Division 2 for sponsorship reasons) was contested by the five regional league winners and runners up of the 3rd level championships of Thailand. The two best 3rd placed teams from the regional leagues also take part

Twelve teams were split into two groups of A & B, with the top two teams from group A & B gaining promotion to the Thai 1st Division for the 2011 campaign, along with this, the two group winners would play off to determine the overall champions.

The teams finishing in 3rd and 4th position would enter another round of playoffs with the bottom four sides of the Thai Division 1 League to determine if they would play in the 1st Division for the 2011 campaign.

2010 Regional League table All locations

2010

red Zone:2010 Regional League Division 2 Bangkok Metropolitan Region 
Yellow Zone:2010 Regional League Division 2 Central & Eastern Region 
Green Zone: 2010 Regional League Division 2 Northern Region Region
  Orange Zone:2010 Regional League Division 2 North Eastern Region  
Blue Zone:2010 Regional League Division 2 Southern Region

List of qualified teams
Last Update October 1, 2011

Bangkok & field (2)
 Bangkok  (Winner)
 J.W. Rangsit (Runner-up)

Central & Eastern (2)
 Saraburi (Winner)
 Samut Prakan (Runner-up)
 Rayong (Highest 3rd point)

Northern (3)
 Chiangmai (Winner)
 Chainat (Runner-up)
 Phichit (Highest 3rd point)

North Eastern (2)
 Loei City (Winner)
 Buriram (Runner-up)

Southern (2)
 Phuket (Winner)
 Trang (Runner-up)

League table

Group A
Last updated December 25, 2010

Group B

3/4 Place Playoff

Final

Champions
The  2010 Regional League Division 2 winners were Buriram

See also
 2010 Thai Premier League
 2010 Thai Division 1 League
 2010 Thai FA Cup
 2010 Kor Royal Cup

External links
Thailand 2010 RSSSF

 
Thai League T4 seasons
3